Unforgettable is a 2017 American drama thriller film directed by Denise Di Novi (in her directorial debut) and written by Christina Hodson. The film stars Rosario Dawson, Katherine Heigl, Geoff Stults, Isabella Rice, and Cheryl Ladd, and follows a divorcée who begins to torment her ex-husband's new fiancée.

Principal photography began on August 17, 2015 in Los Angeles. The film was released on April 21, 2017 by Warner Bros. Pictures. The film, which received mostly negative reviews, grossed $17 million worldwide against its $12–21.5 million budget.

Plot 
Julia Banks is questioned by police after the body of her abusive ex-boyfriend Michael Vargas is found in her home. Despite Julia’s restraining order against Michael, Detective Pope reveals intimate messages and photos from her on Michael’s phone, along with her underwear found in his car.

Six months earlier, Julia moves in with her fiancé David Connover and his daughter Lily, and struggles with the constant presence of Tessa, David's ex-wife and Lily’s mother. Controlling and obsessive, Tessa is not coping with the end of her marriage, exacerbated by her equally cold and demanding mother, Helen-(nicknamed "Lovey"). Stealing Julia’s phone, Tessa accesses her private photos and information, including her recently expired restraining order. She sets up a Facebook account posing as Julia, using it to reach out to Michael. She also steals David’s watch, Julia’s engagement ring, and a pair of her panties, sending the watch and panties to Michael.

Determined to remove Julia from her life, Tessa anonymously sends her flowers, making David suspect Julia is having an affair. Lily wanders away from Julia at a farmer’s market into the arms of Tessa, who lies to make Julia seem unfit to watch her daughter. At riding practice, Tessa tries to force a frightened Lily to ride an unruly horse, but Julia takes Lily home, humiliating Tessa in front of Lovey. Tessa cuts Lily’s long hair as punishment, leading to a heated argument with Julia. As David arrives, Tessa throws herself down the stairs, pretending Julia pushed her. David assures Julia that he loves her, but refuses to see the truth about Tessa.

Julia and her friend Ali discover police records of Tessa’s obsessive and violent tendencies as a child, which led her to burn down her father’s home. As “Julia”, Tessa enjoys sexually explicit messages with Michael, inviting him to visit Julia for sex. Finding the real Julia alone at home, he attacks her, but a badly beaten Julia wounds him with a kitchen knife and escapes. Tessa, waiting outside, stabs Michael in the chest, framing Julia for his murder. Julia is released after being questioned by Detective Pope, who shows David the social media conversations with Michael.

At Tessa's home, David notices her burned gloves in the fireplace and the stolen ring on her finger. He realizes the whole truth, but an enraged Tessa knocks him unconscious with a fireplace poker. Julia arrives, taking Lily to her car, and returns to rescue David but is attacked by Tessa. In the ensuing fight, Tessa is halted by the sight of her bleeding face in a mirror, and by a picture of Lily. As Julia holds her at bay with a knife, Tessa commits suicide by pulling herself onto the blade; dying, she asks Julia not to let Lily remember her like this.

Six months later, David and Julia have married and moved into a new house with Lily. Julia is horrified by the arrival of Lovey, asking to see her granddaughter.

Cast 

 Rosario Dawson as Julia Banks, David's fiancée
 Katherine Heigl as Tessa Connover, David's ex-wife
 Geoff Stults as David Connover, Tessa's ex-husband and Lily's father
 Cheryl Ladd as Helen/"Lovey", Tessa's mother
 Sarah Burns as Sarah, David's friend since childhood
 Whitney Cummings as Ali, Julia’s best friend
 Simon Kassianides as Michael Vargas, Julia's abusive and violent ex-boyfriend
 Isabella Kai Rice as Lily Connover, Tessa and David's daughter
 Robert Ray Wisdom as Detective Pope
 Jayson Blair as Jason

Production 
On January 9, 2014, it was announced that Warner Bros. had hired Amma Asante to direct the female-centric thriller Unforgettable. Denise Di Novi was set to produce the film along with Alison Greenspan, while Christina Hodson was writing the script. On December 2, 2014, Kate Hudson and Kerry Washington were cast as the leads in the film, about a man who is threatened by his ex-wife. On June 22, 2015, after director Asante and actresses Hudson and Washington had left the project, it was revealed that producer Di Novi would make her directorial debut with the film. It was also revealed that David Leslie Johnson had co-written the script along with Hodson.

On August 12, 2015, Katherine Heigl was cast to play Tessa Connover, the sly and mentally unstable divorced mother who threatens her ex-husband, daughter, and her ex-husband's new girlfriend. The same day, Rosario Dawson was cast as the girlfriend, Julia Banks, who tries to fight back against Tessa. On August 21, 2015, additional cast members were announced, including Geoff Stults as David, the ex-husband, Isabella Rice as Lily, the daughter, Cheryl Ladd as Heigl's character's mother, and Simon Kassianides, Whitney Cummings, and Robert Wisdom.

Ravi D. Mehta and Emanuel Michael were also announced as producers of the film, along with other members of the creative team, including cinematographer Caleb Deschanel, production designer Nelson Coates, editor Frédéric Thoraval, and costume designer Marian Toy.

Filming 
Principal photography on the film began on August 17, 2015, in and around Los Angeles.

Release 
Unforgettable was released on April 21, 2017, by Warner Bros. Pictures.

Box office
Unforgettable grossed $11.4 million in the United States and Canada and $6.4 million in other territories for a worldwide gross of $17.8 million. There were different estimates of the budget; the Los Angeles Times reported the film had a production budget of $12 million, while the California Film Commission listed the film as spending $26.9 million on location, for a net budget of $21.5 million after tax rebates.

In the United States and Canada, Unforgettable opened alongside The Promise, Born in China, Free Fire, and Phoenix Forgotten, and was initially projected to gross around $7 million from 2,417 theaters in its opening weekend. However, after grossing just $1.7 million on Friday, weekend projections were lowered to $4–5 million. It ended up opening to $4.8 million, finishing 7th at the box office.

Critical response
On Rotten Tomatoes, the film has an approval rating of 28% based on 119 reviews, with an average rating of 4.00/10. The site's critical consensus reads, "Unforgettables talented cast makes this domestic thriller consistently watchable, even if its failure to fully embrace its premise's campy possibilities prevents it from living up to its title." On Metacritic, the film has a score of 45 out of 100, based on 27 critics, indicating "mixed or average reviews". Audiences polled by CinemaScore gave the film an average grade of "C" on an A+ to F scale.

Vince Mancini of Uproxx called the film "a surprisingly well-executed version of exactly what you assumed it would be. Which is to say, it’s a 'psycho ex' movie that’s fun, but doesn’t exactly reinvent the genre...It’s fun while it lasts, let’s say (the opposite of its title, basically). Sometimes that’s enough, but your mileage may vary." Simran Hans of The Observer gave it 3/5 stars, writing: "This is deliberately silly and knowing satire and I hope it becomes a camp classic." Peter Bradshaw of The Guardian also gave the film 3/5 stars, calling it "a cheerfully outrageous gloss-trash erotic noir in the style that legendary screenwriter Joe Eszterhas used to crank out so lucratively in the 80s and 90s".

Ed Potton of The Times gave it 1/5 stars, writing: "If this were a spoof, it would be a work of genius. Sadly, it's played straight, a glossy melodrama-cum-thriller of staggering cheesiness and unintentional hilarity." Tim Robey of The Daily Telegraph said that the film was "the sort of psychothriller that comes back in ever tattier incarnations, like a wind-tossed scarecrow whose limbs keep falling off", and also gave it 1/5 stars. Neil Genzlinger of The New York Times wrote: "It's woman in jeopardy meets woman on the verge, a reductive brand of thriller from another decade, freshened here only with the addition of a plot element involving Facebook."

References

External links 
 
 
 

2017 films
2017 directorial debut films
2017 drama films
2017 thriller films
2017 thriller drama films
American thriller drama films
2010s English-language films
Films about interracial romance
Films about stalking
Films produced by Denise Di Novi
Films scored by Toby Chu
Films set in Los Angeles
Films shot in Los Angeles
Films with screenplays by Christina Hodson
Warner Bros. films
2010s American films